USS LST-468 was a United States Navy  used in the Asiatic-Pacific Theater during World War II. As with many of her class, the ship was never named. Instead, she was referred to by her hull designation.

Construction
The ship was laid down on 20 October 1942, under Maritime Commission (MARCOM) contract, MC hull 988, by  Kaiser Shipyards, Vancouver, Washington; launched 24 November 1942; and commissioned on 5 March 1943.

Service history
During World War II, LST-468 was assigned to the Asiatic-Pacific theater. She took part in the Eastern New Guinea operations, the Lae occupation in September 1943, and the Saidor occupation in January and February 1944; the Bismarck Archipelago operations, the Cape Gloucester, New Britain landings in December 1943 and  February 1944, and the Admiralty Islands landings in March 1944; Hollandia operation in April 1944; the Western New Guinea operations, the Biak Islands operation in May and June 1944, the Noemfoor Island operation in July 1944, the Cape Sansapor operation in August 1944, and the Morotai landing in September 1944; the Leyte operation in October and November 1944; the Lingayen Gulf landings in January 1945; the consolidation and capture of the Southern Philippines, the Mindanao Island landings in April 1945.

Following the war, LST-468 returned to the United States and was decommissioned on 12 April 1946, and struck from the Navy list on 5 June, that same year. On 30 September 1947, the tank landing ship was sold to the Patapsco Scrap Corp., Baltimore, Maryland, and subsequently scrapped.

Honors and awards
LST-468 earned seven battle stars for her World War II service.

Notes 

Citations

Bibliography 

Online resources

External links

 

1942 ships
World War II amphibious warfare vessels of the United States
LST-1-class tank landing ships of the United States Navy
S3-M2-K2 ships
Ships built in Vancouver, Washington